Brandy Lee Ledford (born February 4, 1969) is an American actress, model and Penthouse magazine's 1992 "Pet of the Year".  She played the role of Desiree on Modern Family, starred as Dawn Masterton on Baywatch Hawaii, and Doyle in the science fiction television series Andromeda.

Career
In addition to Andromeda and Baywatch Hawaii, Ledford also starred in the SciFi Channel series The Invisible Man and the critically acclaimed Whistler, for which she was nominated for two Best Actress awards, at the Leo Awards and Gemini Awards.

Personal life
Ledford was born in Denver, Colorado. In the early 1990s she was married to snowboarder Damian Sanders, and appeared in Critical Condition and Snowboarders in Exile as herself. She was married to Martin Cummins, with whom she has a child. She is currently single.

Filmography

Film

Television

See also 
 List of Penthouse Pets of the Year

References

External links

 

1969 births
American female adult models
American film actresses
American television actresses
Living people
Penthouse Pets of the Year
Actresses from Denver
21st-century American women